The uniform finch (Haplospiza unicolor) is a species of bird in the family Thraupidae.

It is found in the southern Atlantic Forest of Brazil, Paraguay and far northeastern Argentina. Its natural habitats are subtropical or tropical moist lowland forest and subtropical or tropical moist montane forest.

References

uniform finch
Birds of the Atlantic Forest
uniform finch
Taxonomy articles created by Polbot